Nate Dogg is the unreleased third and final studio album by American singer and rapper Nate Dogg. The album was planned to be released on February 25, 2003. The album never released officially, however, some promo copies pressed by Elektra have surfaced.

Track listing

References

2003 albums
Nate Dogg albums
Albums produced by Hi-Tek
Albums produced by Scott Storch
Albums produced by Timbaland
Albums produced by Rockwilder
Albums produced by DJ Quik
Albums produced by Bink (record producer)